Eikrem is a surname. Notable people with the surname include:

Ivar Kornelius Eikrem (1898–1994), Norwegian politician
Knut Hallvard Eikrem (born 1958), Norwegian footballer
Kristoffer Eikrem (born 1989), Norwegian jazz musician, composer and photographer
Magnus Wolff Eikrem (born 1990), Norwegian footballer